Volvariella bombycina, commonly known as the silky sheath, silky rosegill, silver-silk straw mushroom, or tree mushroom, is a species of edible mushroom in the family Pluteaceae. It is an uncommon but widespread species, having been reported from Asia, Australia, the Caribbean, Europe, and North America. The fruit body (mushroom) begins developing in a thin, egg-like sac. This ruptures and the stem expands quickly, leaving the sac at the base of the stem as a volva. On the underside of the cap are closely spaced gills, free from attachment to the stem, and initially white before turning pink as the spores mature. The mushroom grows singly or in clusters, often appearing in old knotholes and wounds in elms and maples. V. bombycina contains compounds with antibacterial properties.

Taxonomy 
The species was first described in 1774 by German naturalist Jacob Christian Schäffer as Agaricus bombycinus. Throughout its taxonomical history, it has been shuffled to several genera, including Pluteus (by Elias Fries in 1836), Volvaria (Paul Kummer, 1871), and Volvariopsis (William Alphonso Murrill, 1911). Rolf Singer placed it in its current genus, Volvariella, in 1951. Other names that have been applied to the species include Jean-Baptiste Lamarck's Amanita calyptrata and August Johann Georg Karl Batsch's Agaricus denudatus (both published in 1783), but these are illegitimate names as Schäffer's earlier 1774 name has priority.

In 1949, Murrill described the variety flaviceps from collections made growing on magnolia wood in Gainesville, Florida. Although he originally described it as a new species, Volvaria flaviceps, Robert Shaffer considered it a variety of V. bombycina. Variety microspora was first described in 1953, was later (1961) named by R.W.G. Dennis; variety palmicola was originally described as a distinct species Volvaria palmicola by Belgian mycologist Maurice Beely in 1928, and later as a variety of V. bombycina by the same author in 1937.

The root for the generic name Volvariella (as well as Volvaria and Volvariopsis, genera in which the species had been formerly placed) derives from the Latin volva, meaning "wrapper" or "a covering". The specific epithet bombycina derives from the Latin root bombyc, or "silky". Common names for the mushroom include the "silky sheath", the "silky rosegill", the "silver-silk straw mushroom", or the "tree mushroom".

Description 

The fruit bodies of Volvariella bombycina are initially egg-shaped when still enclosed in the universal veil. The dry cap surface is covered with silky threads. Its color is white to yellowish, becoming more pale approaching the margin. The flesh is thin, soft, and white, and has an odor, resembling raw potatoes. Gills are crowded close together, free from attachment to the stem, and initially white before turning pinkish as the spores mature. It is white, with a smooth surface, and is often slightly curved. The universal veil is membranous, often areolate (cracked into irregularly shaped blocks) or scaly, and forms a long, saclike volva that wraps around the base of the stem. It is white to yellowish or dingy brown, and often divided into lobes.

Murrill also noted that it developed a "peculiar sickening odor during drying". V. bombycina var. microspora has smaller spores (6–7.5 by 4–5 μm), a yellow cap, and a blotched brown volva. V. bombycina var. palmicola also has a yellow cap and small spores (5.9–7.5 by 4.3–5.4 μm), but can be distinguished from the previous varieties by its distantly spaced gills.

Mushrooms produce a spore print with a color ranging from pinkish to salmon. Spores are elliptical, smooth, and measure 6.5–10 by 4.5–6.5 μm. The basidia (spore-bearing cells) are club-shaped, four-spored, and measure 19–43 by 6–11 μm. Pleurocystidia (cystidia that occur on the gill face) are usually spindle shaped, but have a widely variable morphology; they are abundant in the hymenium, and have dimensions of 26–122 by 8–57 μm. The cheilocystidia (on the gill edge) are similar in morphology and abundance, some may feature knobs held at the end of slender projections up to 20 μm long; dimensions are in the range of 26 and 144 μm long by 8–46 μm wide. Clamp connections are absent from the hyphae of V. bombycina.

The fruit bodies can be readily grown in laboratory culture.

Similar species 
The combination of a silky white cap, white stem, pink gills, pink spore print, and growth on wood is characteristic of this species and make identification of Volvariella bombycina in the field relatively easy. Some Pluteus species have a general similar appearance, and also produce pinkish to pinkish-brown spore prints, but they lack a volva. Amanita species grow on the ground and make white spore prints. V. caesiotincta has a bluish-gray cap, while V. gloiocephala can be distinguished from V. bombycina by its smooth cap that is sticky when damp, and a white volva.

Edibility 
The fruit bodies are edible, and usually considered of good quality. They have been called "excellent", "tasty" with a "modest and pleasant flavor", and "worth eating if found in large enough quantities".

Alexander H. Smith related a story of how unique circumstances led to the development of a local superstition about the species:... the members of a family here in Ann Arbor were poisoned, some fatally, as the result of eating caps of a species of Amanita. The next year Volvaria bombycina fruited on a maple tree at the home of these people, and the story was circulated that some of the spores of the poisonous fungus, which caused the deaths the year before, had escaped from the house, lodged in the tree, germinated, grew and were now producing fruiting bodies. Consequently the carpophores of the Volvaria were held in great awe by the neighbors, and soon came to be referred to as the "ghost mushroom". No one, of course, would consider eating them.

Habitat and distribution 

Volvariella bombycina is a saprobic species. Fruit bodies grow singly or in small groups on trunks and decayed stumps of dead hardwoods. Favored species include sugar maple, red maple, silver maple, magnolia, mango, beech, oak, and elm. It is often found in clefts and knotholes of dead or living tree trunks. It has been noted to fruit in the same location for several years. Despite its preference for hardwoods, it has been reported growing on rare instances on coniferous wood. An uncommon species with a wide distribution, it has been reported from Asia (Iran, China, India, Korea, and Pakistan), the Caribbean (Cuba), Australia, Europe, North America, and South America. It acquired protected status in Hungary in 2005, making it a legal offense to pick it. Variety microspora is known from Venezuela, while V. bombycina var. palmicola occurs in the DR Congo.

Bioactive compounds 
Several bioactive secondary metabolites have been isolated and identified from Volvariella bombycina fruit bodies, mycelium, or pure culture. The compounds ergosta-4,6,8(14),22-tetraene-3-one, ergosterol peroxide, indole-3-carboxaldehyde, and indazole were found in liquid culture. In 2009, the novel compound isodeoxyhelicobasidin was identified from culture broth; this compound inhibits the enzyme human elastase. The fungus also produces compounds that have antioxidative activity.

References

External links

Pluteaceae
Fungi described in 1774
Fungi of Asia
Fungi of Australia
Fungi of Europe
Fungi of North America
Edible fungi
Taxa named by Jacob Christian Schäffer